Super saver may refer to:

Super Saver (horse), winner of the 2010 Kentucky Derby
Super Saver Foods, a former grocery store chain owned by Albertsons
Super Saver Foods (B&R Stores), a grocery chain owned by B&R Stores
Super Saver, a pricing game on The Price Is Right
Super saver, a term used by advertisers